Rata is a Polynesian name, which is reflected in the Māori, Tahitian and  Tuamotu mythology. Also an alternate spelling for Ratha (راثا )an Arabic word or a name given. https://en.m.wikipedia.org/wiki/Ratha
Given names
Rata Harrison (1935–2013), New Zealand rugby league player 
Rata Lovell-Smith (1894–1969), New Zealand artist 

Surname
 Matiu Rata (1934–1997), New Zealand politician
 Te Rata (1877–1933), Māori king

See also
Rață, a Moldovan surname
Rataj
Ratha, an Arabic name